Angels with Broken Wings is a 1941 American comedy film directed by Bernard Vorhaus and starring Jane Frazee and Binnie Barnes. It was released by Republic Pictures.

Cast
Binnie Barnes	 ... 	Sybil Barton
Gilbert Roland	... 	Don Pablo Vincente
Mary Lee	... 	Mary Wilson
Billy Gilbert	... 	Billy Wilson
Jane Frazee	... 	Jane Lord
Edward Norris	... 	Steve Wilson
Leo Gorcey ... Punchy Dorsey

External links
 

1941 films
1941 romantic comedy films
American romantic comedy films
Republic Pictures films
American black-and-white films
1940s English-language films
Films directed by Bernard Vorhaus
1940s American films